Students On Academic Rise (SOAR) High School is an early college high school in Lancaster, California. The high school is a joint project of the Antelope Valley Union High School District and Antelope Valley College. SOAR stands for Students on Academic Rise. The school was founded in 2006. SOAR integrates the Advancement Via Individual Determination (AVID) college-preparatory program as a mandatory elective course for all grade levels. Throughout its history, the school has been served by three principals: Michael Dutton, Chris Grado, and Dr. Stephanie Herrera.

Two SOAR High School students represented SOAR's InvenTeam at the 2015 White House Science Fair. Alumni have enrolled in Harvard, MIT, Columbia, Northwestern, Princeton, UC Berkeley, the University of Chicago, Stanford, UCLA, and many other four-year universities throughout the United States.

Interested students must apply for the program by the annual February deadline, which can be found on the school's website. Applicants are then invited for an interview, and the admissions decisions are announced sometime in late spring.

Student government
Each April, the student body elects the Board of Control, which consists of a President, Vice President, Secretary, Treasurer, Parliamentarian, and Historian, along with additional positions for which eligible candidates may run. This Board convenes weekly and authorizes the events, fundraisers, and monetary transactions of all student-led organizations. The President of the Board of Control is the leader of the Associated Student Body and the de facto student body president. 

Furthermore, the April elections also select the student members of the School Site Council, who are all annually elected by the entire student body, and the class officers of the following year's sophomores, juniors, and seniors. Freshman class officers are elected each summer during the mandatory Summer Bridge Program for incoming students.

The current Constitution of the Associated Student Body was ratified on Thursday, August 31, 2020, and took effect immediately.

Stephanie Franklin is the current Advisor to the Associated Student Body.

Clubs
There are more than a dozen student-led organizations on campus, each under the supervision of the Board of Control of the Associated Student Body. These clubs include:
 Speech Club
National Honor Society
Key Club
 Mock Trial
 Scholars of Science Fellowship (SOSF)
 Queer Straight Alliance (QSA)
 Sports Club
Standardized Test Preparation Club
 Journalism
 Yearbook
 Multicultural Club
 Game Club
 InvenTeam
 Robotics
 Book Club
 Christian Club
 Film and Production Club
Model UN Club
Music Club
Programming Club
Science Club

References

External links
School Website

Education in Lancaster, California
Educational institutions in the United States with year of establishment missing
High schools in Los Angeles County, California
Public high schools in California
2006 establishments in California